HAT-P-21 is a G-type main-sequence star about 910 light-years away. The star has amount of metals similar to solar abundance. The survey in 2015 has failed to detect any stellar companions. The star is rotating rapidly, being spun up by the tides of giant planet on close orbit.

Naming
In 2019, the HAT-P-21 star received the proper name Mazalaai while its planet HAT-P-21b received the name Bambaruush at an international NameExoWorlds contest. These names refer to the Mongolian name for the endangered Gobi bear subspecies, and the Mongolian term for 'bear cub', respectively.

Planetary system
In 2010 a transiting hot super-Jovian planet on moderately eccentric orbit was detected. Its equilibrium temperature is 1283 K. The transit-timing variation survey in 2011 have failed to rule out or confirm the existence of additional planets in the system, until the orbital parameters of HAT-P-21b are known with better precision.

The planetary orbit is likely aligned with the equatorial plane of the star, misalignment equal to 25 degrees.

References

Ursa Major (constellation)
G-type main-sequence stars
Planetary systems with one confirmed planet
Planetary transit variables
J11250598+4101406